In the Canadian census, families consisting of a married couple and children are referred to as Census Families.  The US Census Bureau refers to such household structures as "Married couple families." This demographic features the highest median household income in the United States.

In the definition in Statistics Canada's Census Dictionary, the term "census family"

Refers to a married couple (with or without children of either and/or both spouses), a common-law couple (with or without children of either and/or both partners) or a lone parent of any marital status, with at least one child. A couple may be of opposite sex or same sex. A couple family with children may be further classified as either an intact family in which all children are the biological and/or adopted children of both married spouses or of both common-law partners or a stepfamily with at least one biological or adopted child of only one married spouse or common-law partner and whose birth or adoption preceded the current relationship. Stepfamilies, in turn may be classified as simple or complex. A simple stepfamily is a couple family in which all children are biological or adopted children of one, and only one, married spouse or common-law partner whose birth or adoption preceded the current relationship. A complex stepfamily is a couple family which contains at least one biological or adopted child whose birth or adoption preceded the current relationship. These families contain children from:

 each married spouse or common-law partner and no other children
 one married spouse or common-law partner and at least one other biological or adopted child of the couple
 each married spouse or common-law partner and at least one other biological or adopted child of the couple.
-Statistics Canada

See also
Household income in the United States
US Census Bureau
Household

References

Family in Canada